Setia turriculata is a species of minute sea snail, a marine gastropod mollusk or micromollusk in the family Rissoidae.

Description

Distribution

References

External links
 Monterosato T. A. (di) (1883-1885). Conchiglie littorali mediterranee. Naturalista Siciliano, Palermo, 3(3): 87-91 (1883); 3(4): 102-111; 3(5): 137-140; 3(6): 159-163; 3(8): 227-231; 3(10): 277-281; 4(1-2): 21-25; 4(3): 60-63 (1884); 4(4): 80-84; 4(8): 200-204 (1885)

Rissoidae
Gastropods described in 1884